Slim Zehani (سليم زهاني, born 25 September 1978) is a Tunisian male handball player. He was a member of the Tunisia men's national handball team. He was part of the  team at the 2000 Summer Olympics, playing six matches. On club level he played for Espérance ST in Tunis.

References

Living people
Handball players at the 2000 Summer Olympics
1978 births
Tunisian male handball players
Olympic handball players of Tunisia
People from Tunis